The Plăiești is a right tributary of the river Arieș in Romania. It discharges into the Arieș near Cornești.

References

Rivers of Romania
Rivers of Cluj County